The year 700 BC was a year of the pre-Julian Roman calendar. In the Roman Empire, it was known as year 54 Ab urbe condita . The denomination 700 BC for this year has been used since the early medieval period, when the Anno Domini calendar era became the prevalent method in Europe for naming years.

Events 
 By place 

Europe
The town of Phaselis is founded by the Rhodians

 Middle East 

 Assyrian king Sennacherib launches another campaign into the Chaldean region, where the Babylonian rebel Merodach-Baladan II has been conspiring against him. Merodach-Baladan takes refuge in Elam, north of the Persian Gulf.
 Babylon's Assyrian-raised puppet king Bel-ibni dies after a 3-year reign. He is replaced by Sennacherib's son, Ashur-nadin-shumi. 
 Assyrian king Ashurbanipal has found a library, which includes the earliest known complete copy of the Epic of Gilgamesh.

 By topic 
 Agriculture 
 China's minister of agriculture teaches the peasants crop rotation. He also teaches them to dig drainage ditches, rents them farm equipment, and stores grain surpluses to provide free food in time of famine (approximate date).
 Phoenician colonists plant olive trees on the Iberian Peninsula (modern Spain). They establish trade routes across the Mediterranean.
 Laws against animal slaughter are relaxed in India (approximate date).

 Environment 
 Cities developing in the Near East build aqueducts to keep their residents supplied with water (approximate date).

Births 
 Mentuemhat, Egyptian government official

Deaths 
 Bel-ibni, king of Babylon

Economy
 Money emerged about the year 700 BC

References 

700s BC